Sir John O'Shanassy, KCMG (18 February 1818 – 5 May 1883), was an Irish-Australian politician who served as the 2nd Premier of Victoria. O'Shanassy was born near Thurles in County Tipperary, Ireland, the son of a surveyor, and came to the Port Phillip District (later Victoria) in 1839. He went into business in Melbourne as a draper, and by 1846 he was rich enough to be elected to the Melbourne City Council and to become the founding chairman of the Colonial Bank of Australasia. By the 1850s he was a major landowner and one of the wealthiest men in the colony. He also became a recognised leader of the large Irish Catholic community.

Biography 

O'Shanassy was elected to the inaugural Victorian Legislative Council for City of Melbourne in 1851. When Victoria gained responsible government in 1856, he was elected to the Legislative Assembly for both Melbourne and Kilmore districts, he decided to represent the latter resulting in a by-election for Melbourne. In 1868 he returned to the Council as member for Central Province, then in 1877 he went back to the Assembly as member for Belfast (later known as Port Fairy), which he represented until 1883.

Although he had been regarded as a liberal in his early career, in the colonial Parliament O'Shanassy emerged as the leader of the conservative opposition to the reforming ministry of William Haines, although there was no formal party system in Victoria at this time. His alienation from the liberals was mainly as a result of the tariff issue: most colonial liberals were protectionists, but O'Shanassy was a free trader.

When Haines's ministry fell in March 1857, O'Shanassy succeeded him as Premier, but his government fell in April and Haines returned to office. O'Shanassy was Premier again from March 1858 to October 1859 and his deputy was Charles Gavan Duffy. The combination of these two Irish Catholics heading up the colony's administration was a source of great consternation among the Protestant elite and ensured that sectarian issues emerged in the election of 1859.(G. Serle) However, the Duffy/O'Shanassy link strained, possibly, because O'Shanassy departed Ireland before the turmoil of 1848, while Duffy was involved in the 1848s troubles.(O'Brien)  O'Shanassy was Premier again from November 1861. By the 1860s O'Shanassy had become a thorough-going conservative and his government was bitterly opposed by the liberal newspaper The Age and its fiery proprietor, David Syme. In retaliation, O'Shanassy withdrew government advertising from the paper. O'Shanassy's government was finally defeated in June 1863 over the land reform issue, and he never held office again.

O'Shanassy was awarded a papal knighthood in 1859, but news of that award did not reach Victoria until early 1860. The award was pilloried in the Melbourne Punch (19 January 1860, p. 209). He retired from Parliament in February 1883, shortly before his death in Boroondara, Victoria, Australia.

References 

Geoff Browne, A Biographical Register of the Victorian Parliament, 1900-84, Government Printer, Melbourne, 1985
Don Garden, Victoria: A History, Thomas Nelson, Melbourne, 1984
Elizabeth Malcolm & Dianne Hall, A New History of the Irish in Australia, University of New South Wales Press, Sydney, 2018.
Antony O'Brien, Shenanigans on the Ovens Goldfields: the 1859 election, Artillery Publishing, Hartwell, 2005.
Geoffery Serle,The Golden Age: A History of Colonial Victoria, 1851-1861, Melbourne University Press, Carlton, 1963. (plus numerous reprints)
Kathleen Thompson and Geoffrey Serle, A Biographical Register of the Victorian Parliament, 1856-1900, Australian National University Press, Canberra, 1972
 Raymond Wright, A People's Counsel. A History of the Parliament of Victoria, 1856-1990, Oxford University Press, Melbourne, 1992

Premiers of Victoria
1818 births
1883 deaths
19th-century Irish people
Politicians from Melbourne
Knights Commander of the Order of St Michael and St George
Members of the Victorian Legislative Assembly
Members of the Victorian Legislative Council
People from Thurles
Politicians from County Tipperary
19th-century Australian politicians
Irish emigrants to colonial Australia
Australian bankers
19th-century Australian businesspeople